Under the Grey Banner is the fifth studio album by Swedish power metal band Dragonland. The album was released on 13 November 2011. This is the third part of the Dragonland Chronicles saga. Damian Bajowski (known from PC game The Witcher) created the cover artwork for this chapter of the Dragonland saga.

Track listing

Personnel 
Dragonland
Olof Mörck – guitars, violin
Jonas Heidgert – vocals
Anders Hammer – bass
Elias Holmlid – keyboards
Jesse Lindskog – guitars
Morten Løwe Sørensen – drums

Additional musicians
Fred Johanson
Anna Mariann Lundberg
Elize Ryd
Jake E. Lundberg
Andy Solveström

References

External links 
 Dragonland's Official Teaser Website
 Dragonland's Facebook profile

Dragonland albums